was a Japanese composer. Among his many compositions are three operas Pongo (1965), Ajatasatru (1966), and Kakitsubata (1967).

Works
Books:

References

1919 births
1995 deaths
20th-century classical composers
20th-century Japanese composers
20th-century Japanese male musicians
Japanese classical composers
Japanese economists
Japanese male classical composers
Japanese opera composers
Male opera composers
Musicians from Tokyo